The RS series is a family of naturally-aspirated Grand Prix racing engines, designed, developed and manufactured jointly by Mecachrome and Renault Sport for use in Formula One, and used by Arrows, BAR, Williams, Ligier, Lotus, Caterham, Benetton, Renault, and Red Bull, from  until . Power figures varied; from  @ 12,500 rpm, to later over  @ 19,000 rpm. The 2.4-litre RS26 V8 engine, used in 2006, is one of the highest revving Formula One engines in history, at 20,500 rpm.

Formula One engine specifications

Naturally-aspirated V10 engines

Naturally-aspirated V8 engines

Applications

Williams FW12C
Williams FW13
Williams FW14
Williams FW14B
Williams FW15C
Williams FW16
Williams FW17
Williams FW18
Williams FW19
Williams FW20
Williams FW21
Benetton B195
Benetton B196
Benetton B197
Benetton B198
Benetton B199
Benetton B200
Benetton B201
Renault R202
Renault R23
Renault R24
Renault R25
Renault R26
Renault R27
Renault R28
Renault R29
Renault R30
Renault R31
Lotus T128
Lotus E20
Lotus E21
Red Bull RB3
Red Bull RB4
Red Bull RB5
Red Bull RB6
Red Bull RB7
Red Bull RB8
Red Bull RB9
Ligier JS37
Ligier JS39
Arrows A21
BAR 01
Caterham CT01
Caterham CT03

Note: Including Mecachrome, Supertec, and Playlife-badged engines.

Renault RS Formula One engine World Championship results
12 World Constructors' Championships.
11 World Drivers' Championships.
149 race wins.
160 pole positions.
409 podium finishes.

References

RS
Formula One engines
Gasoline engines by model
V10 engines
V8 engines